Nasamonica is a genus of moths, belonging to the family Coleophoridae or Momphidae. It contains only one species, Nasamonica oxymorpha, which is found in Chad.

References

Coleophoridae
Insects of Chad
Monotypic moth genera
Moths of Africa